Chebika is the name of:

 Chebika, Tozeur, a village and oasis in Tozeur Governorate, Tunisia
 Chebika, Kairouan, a town in Kairouan Governorate, Tunisia